International Congress of Progressive Artists was organised by Young Rhineland (Junge Rheinland), with help from the November Group, the Darmstadt Secession and the Dresden Secession in Düsseldorf, 29-31 May 1922. The aim of creating an international organisation of radical artists led to differing conceptions of how this should be done. Theo van Doesburg wrote "A short review of the proceedings" which included a proclamation calling for a permanent, universal, international exhibition of art from everywhere in the world and an annual universal, international music festival. With the slogan Artists of all nationalities unite’ they declared that "Art must become international or it will perish". According to van Doesburg, when those who refused to sign this proclamation were threatened with exclusion, this led to uproar.

Intervention by the International Constructivist Faction
The conflict around the proclamation was, according to van Doesburg, was resolved by the International Constructivist Faction, which consisted of van Doesburg himself, El Lissitzky and Hans Richter. In the end the proclamation was signed by the following groups and individuals:
 The Young Rhineland, Düsseldorf
 Dresden Secession
 November Group, Berlin
 Darmstadt Secession
 Creative Group, Dresden
 Theodor Däubler
 Else Lasker-Schüler, Berlin
 Herbert Eulenberg
 Oskar Kokoschka
 Christian Rohlfs, Hagen
 Romain Rolland
 Wassily Kandinsky
 Han Ryner
 Edouard Dujardin
 Marcel Millet
 Tristan Rémy
 Marek Schwarz
 Marcel Sauvage (Groupe l’Albatros)
 Paul Jamatty
 Enrico Prampolini
 Pere Créixams
 Henry Poulaille
 Maurice Wullens
 Pierre Larivière (Guilde des Artisans de l’Avenir)
 Josef Quessnel
 Germain Delafons (Les Compagnons)
 Stanisław Kubicki
  A.  Feder
 Jankel Adler
 Arthur Fischer

References

1922 in Germany